Dizengoff 99 is a 1979 Israeli film starring Gali Atari, Gidi Gov, Meir Suissa, and Anat Atzmon. The film, considered a cult classic, describes the way of life around Dizengoff Street and how it changed over the years. Filmed in Tel Aviv, it was released in Israel and the United States as "Dizengoff 99," and in West Germany as "Three Under the Roof".

Plot

The film is about two guys, Natti (Gidi Gov), and Moshon (Meir Suissa), and a girl Ossi (Anat Atzmon) who live together in an apartment at 99 Dizengoff Street, Nightlife center of Tel Aviv. Ossi works for an insurance company and the three of them decide to make a movie using stolen equipment. While they are making movies, they are also having numerous romantic encounters, and having a good time.

Production
Dizengoff 99 is Avi Nesher's second film, and was produced after the success of his first movie, The Troupe (HaLahaka) a year earlier in 1978. Both movies are considered Israeli classics today. Between 2003 and 2016, 99 Dizengoff Street was home to Bauhaus Center Tel Aviv, which offers tours of Tel Aviv's Bauhaus architecture (see White City (Tel Aviv)).

In a 2006 article, it was written that today, Atari thinks her scene from the movie is a black hole in her career that she would rather forget.

Soundtrack
A soundtrack was released to this movie, called "Dizengoff 99" and is filled with notable Israeli artists.

 Dizengoff 99 - Yigal Bashan
 Mesibat Yom Shishi - Tzvika Pick
 Lagur Ito - Riki Gal
 Ovrim Dira - Dori Ben Zeev
 Rok B'Or Yarok - Arik Sinai
 Ein Li Zman Lihiyot Atzuv - Rami Fortis
 Tzlil Mekhuvan - Yitzhak Klepter
 Leyad HaDelet - Yehudit Ravitz
 Lailah Li - Yorik Ben David
 Bein HaRe'ashim - David Broza
 Ad Eizeh Gil - Dani Litani
 Derekh Aruka - Gali Atari

Cast
Gali Atari — Miri
Gidi Gov — Natti
 — Moshon
Anat Atzmon — Ossi
Chelli Goldenberg — Ilana

References

External links

Dizengoff 99, Ishim 

1979 films
1970s Hebrew-language films
Israeli comedy-drama films
Films directed by Avi Nesher
Films set in Tel Aviv
Films set in the 1970s
Films produced by Arnon Milchan